The Hanoi Plan of Action came about on the December 5, 1997, during the Second Informal Summit of the Association of Southeast Asian Nations (ASEAN), made up of Brunei, Cambodia, Indonesia, Laos, Malaysia, Myanmar, the Philippines, Singapore, Thailand, and Vietnam. During this Summit, ASEAN adopted the ASEAN Vision 2020, described as “a concert of Southeast Asian Nations, outward looking, living in peace, stability and prosperity, bonded together in partnership in dynamic development and in a community of caring societies." The HPA of 1997 was the first step in a series of actions to help ASEAN reach these goals.

HPA covers the first time period of the Vision’s timeline, from 1999-2004, with reviews occurring every three years to assess its progress. This plan incorporates economic and social aims that, upon realization, would closer integrate the member nations. The HPA has 10 subdivisions: Strengthen Macroeconomic and Financial Cooperation; Enhance Greater Economic Integration; Promote Science and Technology Development and Develop Information Technology Infrastructure; Promote Social Development and Address the Social Impact of the Financial and Economic Crisis; Promote Human Resource Development; Protect the Environment and Promote Sustainable Development; Strengthen Regional Peace and Security; Enhance ASEAN’s Role as an Effective Force for Peace, Justice, and Moderation in the Asia-Pacific and in the World; Promote ASEAN Awareness and its Standing in the International Community; and Improve ASEAN’s Structures and Mechanisms.

References

ASEAN
Action plans